The Honorary Order of the Palm (Dutch: Ere-Orde van de Palm) is a military and civil state decoration of the Republic of Suriname. The Order was instituted in 1975 at the independence of Suriname and replaced the Dutch Order of Orange-Nassau. It is awarded to individuals for special service in the civil or military field. The order is also eligible for foreigners. The president of Suriname is the Grand Master of the order.

Classes
The Honorary Order of the Palm has two divisions, civil and military, the latter denoted by crossed swords on both the badge and the star.

The following five Classes exist, plus two medals:
Grand Cordon (Grootlint), who wears the badge on a sash on the right shoulder, plus the star on the left side of the chest; 
Grand Officer (Grootofficier), who wears a badge on a necklet, plus a star on the left side of the chest; 
Commander (Commandeur), who wears the badge on a necklet; 
Officer (Officier), who wears the badge on a ribbon with rosette on the left side of the chest; 
Knight (Ridder), who wears the badge on a ribbon on the left side of the chest.
Honorary Medals in Gold and Silver on a ribbon on the left chest

Insignia
The Badge of the order exists of a gold gilt five-pointed star topped with a small balls, and gold gilt rays between the arms, resulting in a badge with the shape of a pentagon. The central disk shows the green palm of the Coat of arms of Suriname on white enamel, surrounded by a red enamel and gold edged ring displaying the motto in yellow (also from the Surinamese Coat of arms): JUSTITIA - PIETAS - FIDES ("Justice - Piety - Fidelity"). The military division has crossed swords placed on the badge.

The Star of the Order is an eight-pointed gold gilt star with straight rays. The central disc is the same as that of the badge. The military division has crossed swords on the star.

The Medal is round, with a gold or silver version. It shows the stylized palm surrounded by a circlet with the motto of the order.

The Ribbon of the order is green with a central white stripe.

Recipients
 Barryl Biekman - a Surinamese-born Dutch politician and activist
 Prince Bernhard of Lippe-Biesterfeld - the prince consort of Queen Juliana
 Gaius de Gaay Fortman
 Roelof Nelissen
 Joop den Uyl - a Dutch politician and Prime Minister of the Netherlands
 Joris Voorhoeve
  - a Surinamese activist
 Grand Cordons
 Theo Bot
 Hendricus Leopold - First Dutch ambassador.
 Antoine Joly - French ambassador.
 Pierre Lardinois
 Jan Pronk - a Dutch politician and UN diplomat
 Fons van der Stee
 Max van der Stoel - a Dutch politician, Minister of Foreign Affairs of the Netherlands, and High Commissioner of the OSCE

References

Palm
Awards established in 1975